Holdridge may refer to:

People:
 Herbert C. Holdridge, American military general, father of John H. Holdridge and adoptive father of Cheryl Holdridge (1892–1974)
 John H. Holdridge, American foreign service officer and diplomat (1924–2001)
 Leslie Holdridge, American botanist and climatologist (1907–1999)
 Cheryl Holdridge, American actress (1944–2009)
 Alex Holdridge, American film writer/director (born 1975)

Places:
 Holdridge Island, Nunavut, Canada

Other:
 14835 Holdridge, asteroid